The Thirty-third Amendment of the Constitution (Court of Appeal) Act 2013 is an amendment to the Constitution of Ireland which established a Court of Appeal to sit between the existing High and Supreme Courts for the purpose of taking over most of the appellate jurisdiction of the Supreme Court. The amendment was approved by the electorate in a referendum on 4 October 2013, and then signed into law by President  Michael D. Higgins on 1 November 2013.

While the amendment provided for the new court to hear most appeals, it also provided for exceptions that could go directly to the Supreme Court. The Thirty-third Amendment makes appeals from the Court of Appeal to the Supreme Court subject to obtaining the Supreme Court's leave. Such leave would only be granted in cases of general public importance or in the interests of justice. The intent of the amendment was to reduce the work load of the Supreme Court, allowing it to concentrate on a smaller number of more important cases. Before the adoption of the amendment, the Supreme Court had mandatory jurisdiction—civil cases decided by the High Court were directly appealable to the Supreme Court, which had no choice over which appeals it heard.

The bill was passed through both houses of the Oireachtas on 24 July 2013. A referendum was held on 4 October 2013, at which 65.1% voted in favour, on a turnout of 39.15%. The Court of Appeal was created in October 2014 under statutes mandated by the amended Constitution.

Background

The Constitution provided for the establishment of two courts: the Supreme Court and the High Court.  Other courts may be established by statute but may not question the constitutionality of legislation. The High Court is a court of first instance with general original jurisdiction, hearing the most important cases in civil law and criminal law (in the latter case sitting as the Central Criminal Court). The High Court also acts as an appellate court for cases initially heard before the Circuit Court, a court of limited jurisdiction.

The Supreme Court hears appeals from the High Court and the Court of Criminal Appeal and, less often, referrals of bills from the President under Article 26 of the Constitution. While the Supreme Court has the final authority to interpret the Constitution, many cases it hears are not constitutional in nature. In 1971 there were five Justices on the Supreme Court and seven on the High Court; in 2009 the respective figures were eight and 36. The number of cases appealed to the Supreme Court has increased faster than the number of justices, resulting in a backlog of several years. In 2006 the then government established a Working Group on a Court of Appeal, chaired by Susan Denham, who was then an ordinary Justice of the Supreme Court and became Chief Justice in 2010. The Working Group's report was published in May 2009.

The 2013 bill was published by Alan Shatter, the Minister for Justice and Equality, on 9 July 2013. It was along the lines of the recommendations of the 2009 Working Group's report.

The bill made one change not related to the new Court of Appeal: removing the "one-judgment rule" which provided that only one opinion could be given by the Supreme Court on constitutional cases. The deletion allowed divergent views, such as in concurring and dissenting opinions, to be published. This change only applies to reviews under Article 34, not review of bills under Article 26.

Changes
The substantive changes to the Constitution were to Article 34, which defines the court system.

The other changes are:
Schedule 2 inserted a transitory article 34A to mandate the establishment of the new Court of Appeal by an ordinary Act of the Oireachtas. (In accordance with one of its own provisions, this article was deleted from the official text of the constitution on 28 October 2014, the day the Court of Appeal was established.)
Schedule 6 scattered consequential amendments to refer to the new Court wherever the Supreme Court and High Court are currently mentioned.
Schedule 7 inserted a transitory article 64 to allow appeals from the High Court pending before the Supreme Court at the creation of the Court of Appeal to be transferred to the new Court.  (In accordance with one of its own provisions, this article was deleted from the official text of the constitution on 28 October 2015, one year after  the Court of Appeal was established.)
Schedule 8 a consequential amendment which would only have been relevant if the Seanad Abolition Bill had become law. That bill was put to referendum the same day as this bill, and was rejected.

The President of the High Court continues to be an ex officio member both of the Council of State and of the Supreme Court (the latter provision is by statute, not under the Constitution). The President of the new court is also a member of both bodies. The existing Court of Criminal Appeal was merged with the new Court of Appeal. The government plans to reduce the number of Supreme Court judges from ten to five as sitting justices retire.

Debate
The bill was supported by all parties in the Dáil and in the Seanad, including the four largest parties, Fine Gael, Labour, Fianna Fáil, and Sinn Féin, all of which ran low-key campaigns. On 1 October 2013 all four issued a joint statement urging a Yes-vote.

A Referendum Commission was established, as required by law, to oversee the referendum to be held on 4 October 2013.  The referendum commission's dedicated website was launched on 5 September 2013.

Alan Shatter expressed concern that the referendum would be overshadowed by the simultaneous referendum proposing abolition of the Seanad. Shatter also criticised RTÉ's coverage of the referendum, suggesting it avoided discussing the issue at all for fear of violating its obligation of neutrality.

Elizabeth Dunne, the High Court judge who chaired the Referendum Commission, expressed concern about the lack of public debate on the Court of Appeal proposal.

In a speech on 27 September, Chief Justice Susan Denham described the current backlog of court cases as "unsustainable" and the referendum as "an invitation for citizens to enable the superior courts to work better"; she did not explicitly advocate a yes vote, because separation of powers required judges to be impartial. Michael Williams, a solicitor opposed to the referendum, felt the speech "stepped across the line" into politics. The Law Society of Ireland, the professional body for solicitors, recommended that its members advise clients to vote yes. The Bar Council of Ireland, the body for barristers, also called for a Yes-vote.  The Irish Farmers' Association advised farmers to support the bill to reduce delays in litigation.

Michael Williams wrote in The Irish Times that the Court of Appeal was no substitute for a more fundamental reform of the Irish judicial system, which he said was unlikely as it would challenge the vested interests of lawyers. Mattie McGrath expressed a similar viewpoint and called for a No-vote. While Williams favours removing the one-judgment rule, he criticised the joining of that with the Court of Appeal in a single amendment requiring a single referendum. Seth Barrett Tillman, a lecturer in law at National University of Ireland, Maynooth, considered that, since the Court of Criminal Appeal had been created without a constitutional amendment, the same ought to be possible for a Civil Court of Appeal. Lawyer Paul Anthony McDermott suggested the delays in hearing cases were caused by too many litigants rather than too few judges or courts. Diarmuid Rossa Phelan, a prominent Irish barrister and law professor at the School of Law at Trinity College Dublin, suggested that giving the Supreme Court absolute discretion to select which cases to hear was dangerous and would need to be monitored for mission creep. The Master of the High Court, Edmund Honohan, described the proposal as a "crude device" that would lead to an increase in litigation and in interlocutory appeals, and claimed the Supreme Court's backlog could be cleared by addressing "case management, time management, paper management, submissions and so forth".

The Irish Times noted that "few voices" were "raised against the amendment" and that awareness of the issues was hampered by the prohibition of publicly funded advocacy campaigning; it recommended a Yes-vote. Ruadhan Mac Cormaic, legal affairs correspondent for the Times, reported that many lawyers were privately sceptical that the court would reduce the backlog, and that if its cases were perceived tediously technical it might struggle to recruit high-quality judges.

Opinion polls
An opinion poll on 10–17 September 2013 asked how well voters felt they understood the issue. Of respondents, 6% said "very well", 9% "quite well", 30% "to some extent", 21% "not particularly well" and 33% "not at all".

Note

Voting card error
Dublin City Council apologised after using an out-of-date electoral register file to generate polling information cards; this resulted in 35,000 voters and deceased people receiving incorrect information about where to vote. Cards were regenerated using the correct data.

Result

Enactment and implementation
The referendum returning officer issued a provisional result certificate of the votes, which was published in Iris Oifigiúil on 8 October 2013. As no petition challenging the results was lodged at the High Court by 15 October, the certificate became final. President Michael D. Higgins signed the bill into law on 1 November 2013, after returning from a state visit to Central America.

Before the new court could come into being, statutory laws regulating its operation must be passed, and judges recruited.  Sean Ryan was announced as the President-designate of the new Court on 25 February 2014. The Court of Appeal Act 2014 was introduced as a government bill on 2 July 2014, passed by the Dáil on 15 July and the Seanad on 16 July, and signed by the President on 20 July. On 23 July the government named six High Court judges who would be transferred to the new Court under Ryan. Statutory instruments commenced the 2014 Act in two stages in September and October 2014. The Court of Appeal came into being on 28 October 2014 and its first nine judges were appointed by the President at 6.30 pm the following day.

In September 2016, a paper in The Irish Law Times claimed "the Court of Appeal never had a prayer of solving the problem that was put to the people in this referendum, which was solving the backlog", with 1,814 cases pending at the end of 2015 compared to 2,001 cases at the start. A spokesperson for the court said it would process cases faster when it "finds its rhythm".

References

Footnotes

External links
 Thirty-third Amendment of the Constitution Act, 2013 Irish Statute Book
 Thirty-third Amendment of the Constitution (Court of Appeal) Bill 2013 Oireachtas website
 
 Referendum 2013 The Irish Times

2013 in Irish law
2013 in Irish politics
2013 in the Republic of Ireland
33
33
33
October 2013 events in Europe
Amendment, 33